Dmitry Vladimirovich Strakhov (born 17 May 1995) is a Russian professional racing cyclist, who currently rides for UCI ProTeam . He rode in the men's point race event at the 2017 UCI Track Cycling World Championships. In May 2019, he was named in the startlist for the 2019 Giro d'Italia.

On 11 March 2020, it was reported that Strakhov had been infected by SARS-CoV-2, the virus that causes coronavirus disease 2019. He was reported to have been hospitalized in an Abu Dhabi hospital, after being placed in quarantine following the 2020 UAE Tour.

Major results

2016
 1st  Young rider classification Volta Internacional Cova da Beira
2017
 3rd Prueba Villafranca-Ordiziako Klasika
 4th Overall Vuelta Ciclista Comunidad de Madrid
1st  Young rider classification
 7th Overall Volta Internacional Cova da Beira
1st  Young rider classification
 10th Trofeo Matteotti
2018
 1st  Overall GP Beiras e Serra da Estrela
1st Stage 1
 1st Clássica da Arrábida
 Volta ao Alentejo
1st Stages 2 & 3
 1st Stage 1 Volta Internacional Cova da Beira
 1st Stage 1 Vuelta Asturias Julio Alvarez Mendo
 5th Klasika Primavera
 8th Overall Tour of Britain
 9th Overall Arctic Race of Norway
 9th Overall Vuelta Ciclista Comunidad de Madrid
 10th GP Miguel Induráin
2022
 1st  Sprints classification UAE Tour

Grand Tour general classification results timeline

References

External links
 

1995 births
Living people
Russian male cyclists
Sportspeople from Vyborg